José Alfredo Peñaloza Soto (born March 29, 1974, in Mexico City, Mexico) is a Mexican football referee. He has been a football professional referee since 2001.

Refereeing debut
On January 12, 2003, Peñaloza made his debut as a referee in the Primera "A" match between Cihuatlan vs. Correcaminos U.A.T. in Round 1 of Torneo Verano 2003.

Primera "A"
 12-1-03:  Cihuatlan 1 - 2 Correcaminos U.A.T.

On August 4, 2007, Peñaloza made his debut in the Mexican Primera Division as match referee in torneo apertura 2007 in a match between Monarcas Morelia and Tiburones Rojos de Veracruz played at Estadio Morelos in Morelia. The result was a draw.

Mexican 1st Division
 4-8-07:  Morelia 1 - 1 Veracruz

FIFA accreditation
In 2010, Peñaloza and Ricardo Arellano were international football referees as part of the 20-member football officiating crew by representing Mexico in FIFA.  Every officials uniform has a FIFA FAIR PLAY patch located on the left-side sleeve of its uniform meaning in the fairness of soccer throughout Mexico and rest of the world.

Career in domestic leagues
Peñaloza has refereed more than 100 matches which ranks him 11th on the all-time match refereeing list. Benito Archundia Tellez is at the top of the list with over 500 matches in Mexican Football Federation history.

Mexican 1st Division
 2007/2008 season: 9 matches
 2008/2009 season: 24 matches (including: 2 quarter-finals 1st leg; semi-final 1st leg)
 2009/2010 season: 24 matches (including: 2 quarter-finals 2nd leg; semi-final 1st leg)
 2010/2011 season: 15 matches
 2011/2012 season: 18 matches (including: 1 quarter-final 1st leg)

Liga MX
 2012/2013 season: 18 matches (including: 1 quarter-final 1st leg)
Mexican Primera A
 2002-03 season: 4 matches
 2003-04 season: 8 matches
 2004-05 season: 19 matches
 2005-06 season: 16 matches
 2006-07 season: 13 matches
 2007-08 season: 8 matches
 2008-09 season: 1 Match

 Fuerzas Basicas Sub-15
 2010-11 season: 3 matches
 2011-12 season: 1 Match
Overall match officiating in FEMEXFUT: 181 matches officiating

Officialing in international tournaments
Peñaloza has made history to refereed the first int'l soccer tournament since FIFA issues the match official license in late 2009, he represents CONCACAF as part of six soccer confederations.

CONCACAF Champions League
 31-3-10:  UNAM 1 - 0 Cruz Azul (semi-final) (1st leg)
 28-3-12:  Monterrey 3 - 0 UNAM Pumas (semi-final) (1st leg)
 23-8-12:  LA Galaxy 5 - 2 Metapan (group stage)
 28-8-13:  Heredia 1 - 0 San Jose Earthquakes (group stage)

World Cup Qualifying 2014 - Concacaf
 11-10-11: Guatemala 3 - 1 Belize (2nd Round)

CONCACAF U-20 Championship Puebla 2013
 18-2-13:  Cuba U20 2 - 1 Canada U20
 22-2-13:  United States U20 1 - 0 Costa Rica U20
 26-2-13:  Cuba U20 2 - 1 Costa Rica U20

Toulon Tournament 2014
 22-5-14: England U-20 3 - 0 Qatar U-20 (group B)
 26-5-14: Colombia U-20 0 - 1 South Korea U-20 (group B)

Accomplishments
Peñaloza has been the fourth official in the Torneo final twice occurring in the second leg, once in Torneo Clasura 2009 final between Pumas UNAM and Tuzos Pachuca and in the Torneo Bicentenario 2010 final between Club Deportivo Toluca and Santos Laguna before the 2010 FIFA World Cup takes place in South Africa.  Same role as fourth official in the 2011 & 2012 Copa Santander Libertadores throughout the tournament.  Penaloza has reach 300 games officiating in his outstanding career, currently ranked 7th on the all-time officiating list.

External links
 http://www.femexfut.org.mx/
 FIFA.com

1974 births
Living people
Mexican football referees
Sportspeople from Mexico City
CONCACAF Champions League referees